Rustin is an upcoming American biographical drama film directed by George C. Wolfe from a screenplay written by Julian Breece and Dustin Lance Black. The film is produced by Barack and Michelle Obama's production company Higher Ground Productions. The story revolves around gay civil rights activist Bayard Rustin, who helped organize the 1963 March on Washington alongside Martin Luther King Jr. It is scheduled to be released on Netflix in 2023.

Cast

Colman Domingo as Bayard Rustin
Chris Rock as Roy Wilkins
Glynn Turman as A. Philip Randolph
Audra McDonald as Ella Baker
Aml Ameen as Martin Luther King Jr.
CCH Pounder as Anna Arnold Hedgeman
Michael Potts as Cleveland Robinson
Bill Irwin as A. J. Muste
Da'Vine Joy Randolph
Thomas W Wolf as Chief Deputy Barnes
Gus Halper as Tom
Johnny Ramey as Elias
Carra Patterson as Coretta Scott King
Adrienne Warren as Claudia Taylor
Jeffrey Wright
Grantham Coleman
Lilli Kay
Jordan-Amanda Hall
Jakeem Dante Powell
Ayana Workman
Jamilah Nadege Rosemond
Jules Latimer
Maxwell Whittington-Cooper
Frank Harts
Kevin Mambo
Cotter Smith as Chief Wells

Production
In February 2021, it was reported that George C. Wolfe would direct a film based on the life of Bayard Rustin from a script by Julian Breece and Dustin Lance Black. In October 2021, Colman Domingo was cast as Rustin. Chris Rock, Glynn Turman, and Audra McDonald also joined the cast. Later that month, Aml Ameen, CCH Pounder, Michael Potts, Bill Irwin, Da'Vine Joy Randolph, Gus Halper, Johnny Ramey, Carra Patterson, and Adrienne Warren joined the cast. Production began in November 2021 in Pittsburgh.  In December 2021, Jeffrey Wright, Grantham Coleman, Lilli Kay, Jordan-Amanda Hall, Jakeem Dante Powell, Ayana Workman, Jamilah Nadege Rosemond, Jules Latimer, Maxwell Whittington-Cooper, Frank Harts and Kevin Mambo joined the cast.

Upon the announcement of Colman Domingo being cast in the lead role, the Bayard Rustin Center for Social Justice, an LGBTQIA safe-space, community activist center, and educational bridge dedicated to honoring Bayard Rustin through their mission and good works, voiced their approval directly to Domingo, espousing that "Your powerful voice helps amplify Bayard Rustin, Godfather of Intersectionality, Planned the March, Brought non-violence to the Movement, Inspired the Freedom Riders, Lost to history because of who he loved, Who he was. Angelic Troublemakers unite!"

Release  
The film produced by Higher Ground Productions is expected to be released by Netflix in 2023.

See also
 Civil rights movement in popular culture

References

External 
 

Upcoming films
Upcoming English-language films
American drama films
English-language Netflix original films
Films directed by George C. Wolfe
Films shot in Pittsburgh
Films with screenplays by Dustin Lance Black
Higher Ground Productions films
Upcoming Netflix original films
Cultural depictions of Martin Luther King Jr.
Civil rights movement in film
2023 LGBT-related films
American LGBT-related films
LGBT-related biographical films
LGBT-related drama films